A Chit Phwae Lay Nyin is a 2020 Burmese romantic-drama television series starring Kyaw Htet Zaw, Than Thar Moe Theint, Khant, Nyi Htut Khaung, Khin Thazin, Mike Mike, Yan Kyaw and Theingi Htun. Kyaw Htet Zaw acted two characters for twin brothers. It aired on MRTV-4, from April 15 to June 16, 2020, on Mondays to Fridays at 19:00 for 45 episodes.

Synopsis 

Yaung Ni Oo and his mother left his father's home, and his mother lived as a philanthropist doctor in Pindaya. His mother was ill and she died because his father did not send medicine from his medical company. A few years ago, Yaung Ni Oo and Moe Thauk Oo and Shay Yay Sat attended together at the University of Medicine, and they became very close. Later Moe Thauk Oo headed a medical company, and Yaung Ni Oo was a philanthropist doctor in Pindaya, where he met May Pyo Phyu and pretend to married to May Pyo Phyu because of company's financial crisis. But a few months later, Yaung Ni Oo really loved May Pyo Phyu and May Pyo Phyu also loved him. Then Moe Thauk Oo was hospitalized for an accident by assassination of ruthless people, U Nyan Min Kyaw, Moe Kalayar and Han Sit Thway and forgot the past, so Yaung Ni Oo pretended as Moe Thauk Oo to continue the company's affairs.

Cast

Main
 Kyaw Htet Zaw in dual role as Yaung Ni Oo / Moe Thauk Oo (twins)
 Than Thar Moe Theint as May Pyo Phyu
 Khant as Shay Yay Sat

Supporting
 Nyi Htut Khaung as U Nyan Min Kyaw
 Khin Thazin as Moe Kalyar
 Mike Mike as Han Sit Thway
 Yan Kyaw as U Tin Maung Oo, father of Yaung Ni Oo and Moe Thauk Oo
 Theingi Htun as Daw Chain Si, mother of May Pyo Phyu
 Sharr as Ya Min
 Nan Eaindray as Ei May Phoo
 Zin Cho Khine Oo as Khine Zun
 Goon Pone Gyi as Kye Kye Myint

References

Burmese television series
MRTV (TV network) original programming